The B-10, also known as Ronda Litoral (English: Coastal Ring Road), is a  freeway in Catalonia, Spain partially encircling Barcelona passing through the eastern side of the city. It starts at Nus de la Trinitat interchange in northern Barcelona and runs along the entire length of the Besòs River and the city's coastline south to Nus del Llobregat interchange in Barcelona's southern suburbs, where it becomes the Autovía A-2.  Both north and south end interchanges link the freeway to the B-20 or Ronda de Dalt, which encircles Barcelona passing through the western side, jointly forming a beltway commonly referred to as the rondes that surrounds the city.

The freeway features a mix of below-grade, at-grade and covered tunnel sections, mainly as it passes through central Barcelona, where it is only two lanes in each direction while the other sections are three lanes. It becomes a segregated urban highway as it passes through central and northern Barcelona so that all its signposting becomes green and is maintained by the Metropolitan Area of Barcelona. In contrast, the southern section of B-10 is considered to be part of European route E90 and is signposted in blue following the formal colour scheme for motorways since it serves as a continuation of the Autovía A-2. In addition, unlike the rest of the route, this section is named Cinturó Litoral and is maintained by the Spanish Government.

Although the speed limit is  along the urban freeway section and  along the interurban section, car's average top speed is lower due to traffic congestion as it serves as an arterial corridor to access Barcelona by road, and even average top speed may reach  during rush hour. Additional restrictions for heavy goods vehicles are applied on the section situated between Montjuïc–Morrot and Rambla de Prim near Sant Adrià de Besòs, whereby weight limits is posted 12 tonnes and all vehicles over 12 meters long are banned from that section.

Exit list
Exits on the rondes are numbered 1 to 30 anticlockwise from Nus de la Trinitat according to the beltway that Ronda Litoral (B-10) and Ronda de Dalt (B-20) freeways form around Barcelona so that exits on Ronda de Dalt are officially numbered 1 to 16 (southbound), while on Ronda Litoral are numbered 17 to 30 (northbound). Strangely enough, while the entire urban highway section follows the exit numbering scheme of the rondes, the interurban section that is maintained by the Spanish Government does not and exits on this section are numbered 13 to 19 following its own scheme. In addition, route markers are placed north–south in relation to Nus de la Trinitat, where the road's "Kilometre Zero" is placed, on the contrary of the exits' numbering.

{| class="wikitable" 
|-
! Municipality 
! km 
! Mile 
! Exit 
! Name
! Destinations 
! Notes
|-
| rowspan="2" | Barcelona–Santa Coloma de Gramenet || align="right" style="background: #F2F2F2;" | 0.0 || align="right" style="background: #F2F2F2;" | 0.0 || align="center" colspan="4" | Nus de la Trinitat
|-
| align="right" style="background: #F2F2F2;" | 0.4–1.0 || align="right" style="background: #F2F2F2;" | 0.2–0.6 ||align="center" | 30 || Bon Pastor || Santa Coloma de Gramenet, Potosí Street || 
|-
| rowspan="7" | Sant Adrià de Besòs || align="right" style="background: #F2F2F2;" | 2.2 || align="right" style="background: #F2F2F2;" | 1.3  || align="center" | 29 || Verneda || Sant Adrià de Besòs, Guipúscoa Street || Northbound exit is via exit 26 (km 3.8)
|-
| align="right" style="background: #F2F2F2;" | 2.7 || align="right" style="background: #F2F2F2;" | 1.6 || align="center" style="background: #FFDDDD;" | 28 || style="background: #FFDDDD;" | Gran Via || style="background: #FFDDDD;" |  || style="background: #FFDDDD;" | No northbound exit
|-
| align="right" style="background: #F2F2F2;" | 3.0 || align="right" style="background: #F2F2F2;" | 1.8 || align="center" | 27 || Badalona ||  || Indirect access to Carretera Nacional N-II
|-
| align="right" style="background: #F2F2F2;" | 3.8 || align="right" style="background: #F2F2F2;" | 2.3 || align="center" | 26 || Sant Adrià || Cristòfol de Moura Street, La Catalana Neighbourhood || Northbound exit only; southbound exit is via exit 29
|-
| align="right" style="background: #F2F2F2;" | 3.9 || align="right" style="background: #F2F2F2;" | 2.4 || align="center" | 26 || Sant Adrià || La Mina Neighbourhood, La Catalana Neighbourhood, Llull Street || Southbound exit only; northbound exit is via exit 25
|-
| align="right" style="background: #F2F2F2;" | 4.3 || align="right" style="background: #F2F2F2;" | 2.6 || align="center" | 24 || Diagonal Mar || Rambla de Prim, Passeig de Garcia Fària, Sant Adrià de Besòs || Southbound exit only; northbound exit is via exit 24 named "Besòs"
|-
| align="right" style="background: #F2F2F2;" | 4.7 || align="right" style="background: #F2F2F2;" | 2.9 || align="center" | 25 || Port Fòrum Sant Adrià || Eduard Maristany Avenue || Northbound exit only; southbound exit is via exit 26 (km 3.9)
|-
| rowspan="14" | Barcelona || align="right" style="background: #F2F2F2;" | 6.0 || align="right" style="background: #F2F2F2;" | 3.7 || align="center" | 24 || Besòs || Rambla de Prim, Diagonal Mar, Port Fòrum Sant Adrià ||  Northbound exit; southbound exit is via exit 24 named "Diagonal Mar"
|-
| align="right" style="background: #F2F2F2;" | 7.4 || align="right" style="background: #F2F2F2;" | 4.5 || align="center" | 23 || Poblenou || Marina, Port Olímpic, Parc del Mar || Northbound exit is via exit 22 (km 9.5)
|-
| align="right" style="background: #F2F2F2;" | 7.9 || align="right" style="background: #F2F2F2;" | 4.9 || align="center" style="background: #FFDDDD;" | 23 || style="background: #FFDDDD;" | Poblenou || style="background: #FFDDDD;" | Bac de Roda Street, Avinguda Litoral || style="background: #FFDDDD;" | No southbound exit
|-
| align="right" style="background: #F2F2F2;" | 9.0 || align="right" style="background: #F2F2F2;" | 5.5 || align="center" style="background: #FFDDDD;" | 22 || style="background: #FFDDDD;" | Barceloneta || style="background: #FFDDDD;" | Pla de Palau, Via Laietana, Port Vell || style="background: #FFDDDD;" | 
|-
| align="right" style="background: #F2F2F2;" | 9.5 || align="right" style="background: #F2F2F2;" | 5.9 || align="center" | 22 || Barceloneta || Marina, Port Olímpic, Hospital del Mar, Parc del Mar  ||  Southbound exit is via exit 23 (km 7.4)
|-
| align="right" style="background: #F2F2F2;" | 10.7 || align="right" style="background: #F2F2F2;" | 5.9 || align="center" | 21 || Ciutat Vella || Paral·lel Street, Ciutat Vella, Port Vell, Estació Marítima Balears ||  Northbound exit via the other exit numbered 21
|-
| align="right" style="background: #F2F2F2;" | 11.0 || align="right" style="background: #F2F2F2;" | 5.9 || align="center" | 20 || Port || Port – Mercaderies  ||  
|-
| align="right" style="background: #F2F2F2;" | 11.6 || align="right" style="background: #F2F2F2;" | 5.9 || align="center" | 21 || Ciutat Vella || Paral·lel Street, La Rambla, Montjuïc, Port Vell ||  
|-
| align="center" colspan="6" | South end of the urban highway section
|-
| align="right" style="background: #F2F2F2;" | 13.4 || align="right" style="background: #F2F2F2;" | 5.9 || align="center" | 13 || || Montjuïc, Passeig de Cantunis, Montjuïc Cemetery, Anella Olímpica  ||  
|-
| align="right" style="background: #F2F2F2;" |  || align="right" style="background: #F2F2F2;" |  || align="center" | 14 || || Zona Franca, Mercabarna, Passeig de Zona Franca, Port || 
|-
| align="right" style="background: #F2F2F2;" |  || align="right" style="background: #F2F2F2;" |  || align="center" | 17 || ||  Zona Franca, Can Tunis Freight Station || 
|-
| align="right" style="background: #F2F2F2;" |  || align="right" style="background: #F2F2F2;" |  || align="center" | 18B ||  || Zona Franca – 3rd Street || 
|-
| align="right" style="background: #F2F2F2;" |  || align="right" style="background: #F2F2F2;" |  || align="center" | 18A ||  || Zona Franca, Mercabarna, Logistics Area (Z.A.L.) || 
|-
| rowspan="2" | L'Hospitalet de Llobregat || align="right" style="background: #F2F2F2;" |  || align="right" style="background: #F2F2F2;" |  || align="center" | 18 ||  ||  || 
|-
| align="right" style="background: #F2F2F2;" |  || align="right" style="background: #F2F2F2;" |  || align="center" | 19 ||  ||  B-20 / C-32 – El Prat de Llobregat, Castelldefels ||

See also

B-20 motorway (Spain)
 Street names in Barcelona
 Urban planning of Barcelona

References

External links

 Trànsit B-10 on Twitter. Real-time traffic information about B-10 by the Catalan Traffic Agency. 
 Real-time images from traffic cameras installed along Ronda Litoral: Zona FrancaMoll de la Fusta Badajoz Street Bon Pastor Neighbourhood
 Northbound driving on Ronda Litoral on YouTube

Ring roads in Spain
Motorways in Catalonia
Roads in Barcelona
European route E90 in Spain
Transport in Barcelonès